Sperry Jones Rademaker (October 4, 1939 – January 31, 2005) was an American sprint canoer who competed at the 1968 Summer Olympics in Mexico City. She finished seventh in the K-2 500 m event.

A native of Oklahoma City, Oklahoma, she was the older sister of Marcia Jones-Smoke who won a bronze medal in the K-1 500 m event at the 1964 Summer Olympics in Tokyo.

References
Sport-reference.com profile

Following her 7th place in the 1969 Olympics, Sperry Joanna Jones Rademaker continued to compete. She was a national champion at the 1973 United States Canoe Association (USCA) National Championships, held in Marinette, Wisconsin, winning the Women's 13-mile race in a C-2 with Janet Streib, with a time of 1:59:26. At the 1974 USCA Marathon Race in Waco, Texas, she won third place in the C-2 Women's Cruising (20 miles) with race partner Iva Sawtelle, with a time of 3:09:41, and placed 5th in the C-2 Mixed Cruising with race partner and husband, Jack Rademaker, both residents of Floral City, Florida.

In 1975, Sperry and husband Jack ranked 8th in the C-2 Mixed Couples USCA National Race on the St. Josephs River, with a time of 2:35:22. The race ran from Constantine, Michigan to Bristol, Indiana. At that same race, Sperry placed 2nd in the C-2 Women's Competition Cruisers with Carol Davis of Winnetka, Illinois, with a time of 2:39:23. The following year, she raced again at the USCA National Championships with Carol Davis on the Little Miami River in Milford, Ohio, to again place 2nd in the 20-mile C-2 Women Cruisers with a time of 3:02:15. She also garnered a 7th place with husband Jack in the C-2 Mixed Couples (also a 20-mile race) with a time of 3:08:02.

In the 1977 USCA National Championships, Sperry took up her Olympic K-1 boat to place 2nd behind Janet Streib, with a time of 2:06:56.

Sperry won the C-2 Women's event at the 1978 USCA National Championships in St. Charles, Illinois with Connie Barton of Homer, Michigan. [1]

By 1987, Sperry and husband Jack Rademaker had been winning athletic trophies and medals for more than 25 years. The Floral City residents had amassed nearly 400 prizes in canoe and kayaking, triathlons and table tennis. [2]

References 
1. USCA History of the United States Canoe Association http://webpages.charter.net/mwcanoe/NAT-PDF/NAT.RES_70s.pdf, retrieved 2011-10-09
2. St. Petersburg Time, Citrus Edition, Photo and caption by Joanne Harris Feb. 19, 1987, Page 3.

1939 births
2005 deaths
American female canoeists
Canoeists at the 1968 Summer Olympics
Olympic canoeists of the United States
Sportspeople from Oklahoma City
20th-century American women
21st-century American women